John Richard Egers (January 28, 1949 – September 10, 2021) was a Canadian professional ice hockey right winger.

Originally drafted in 1966 by the New York Rangers, Egers would also play for the St. Louis Blues and Washington Capitals.  Egers was an original member of the Capitals, who claimed him in the 1974 NHL Expansion Draft.  He holds the distinction of scoring the first game-winning goal for the team, on October 17, 1974, against the Chicago Black Hawks.

Egers was later a captain in the Kitchener Fire Department. He died at the age of 72 on September 10, 2021.

References

External links
Profile at hockeydraftcentral.com

1949 births
2021 deaths
Baltimore Clippers players
Canadian ice hockey right wingers
Ice hockey people from Ontario
Kitchener Rangers players
New York Rangers draft picks
New York Rangers players
Omaha Knights (CHL) players
St. Louis Blues players
Sportspeople from Greater Sudbury
Washington Capitals players